The 2022–23 season is the 126th season in the existence of Mansfield Town Football Club and the club's tenth consecutive season in League Two. In addition to the league, they will also compete in the 2022–23 FA Cup, the 2022–23 EFL Cup and the 2022–23 EFL Trophy.

Transfers

In

Out

Loans in

Loans out

Pre-season and friendlies
On June 9, the Stags confirmed their pre-season schedule, which included a training camp in Scotland. A behind-closed-doors friendly with Sheffield United was later added.

Competitions

Overall record

League Two

League table

Results summary

Results by round

Matches

On 23 June, the league fixtures were announced.

FA Cup

The Stags were drawn away to Barrow in the first round and to Sheffield Wednesday in the second round.

EFL Cup

EFL Trophy

On 20 June, the initial Group stage draw was made, grouping Mansfield Town with Derby County and Grimsby Town. In the second round, Town were drawn away to Everton U21.

References

Mansfield Town
Mansfield Town F.C. seasons